Lavoro Politico (Italian: Political Work) was a Marxist–Leninist magazine published in Verona, Italy, in the period 1967–1969. It was one of the radical publications launched during the student movements in the late 1960s.

History and profile
The first issue of the magazine appeared in October 1967. It was published by Centro di informazione on a monthly basis. Its editor was Walter Peruzzi. Mara Cagol and Renato Curcio were among the contributors. 

Lavoro Politico supported class war as suggested by Karl Marx, Lenin and Mao and became a very prestigious theoretical publication among the radical students in Italy. It particularly praised the Red Guards movement in China. Lavoro Politico  was one of the ardent critics of the workerism advocated by other Italian communist publications such as Classe Operaia. The magazine folded in 1969 after publishing the issue numbered 11–12.

References

1967 establishments in Italy
1969 disestablishments in Italy
Defunct political magazines published in Italy
Italian-language magazines
Magazines established in 1967
Magazines disestablished in 1969
Mass media in Verona
Marxist magazines
Monthly magazines published in Italy